Maniq language may refer to two languages spoken by the Maniq people (Mani'):
 Ten'edn
 Kensiu language